Lois Cheche Lewis Brutus is a Liberian diplomat. She was ambassador to the United States. She was president of the Association of Female Lawyers of Liberia.

Life 
She graduated from University of Liberia, and the Louis Arthur Grimes School of Law . In June 2007, she became ambassador to South Africa. She was project coordinator for the USAID, Children Assistance Program.

References 

Liberian women diplomats
Living people
Ambassadors of Liberia to the United States
Year of birth missing (living people)
Liberian women ambassadors
Ambassadors of Liberia to South Africa
University of Liberia alumni
21st-century Liberian diplomats